Warren E. Miller (born October 5, 1964) was a member of the Maryland House of Delegates. Miller represented District 9A, which includes parts of Howard and Carroll counties. Miller was appointed by Governor Bob Ehrlich on March 7, 2003 to replace Robert L. Flanagan, who resigned from the Maryland House of Delegates on February 28, 2003, to become the Maryland Secretary of Transportation. On November 30, 2020, Miller announced his intent to resign at the end of 2020.

Elections
In 2006, Miller, along with fellow Republican Gail H. Bates, defeated David Leonard Osmundson to maintain his District 9A seat.

Education
Miller attended Glenelg High School in Howard County. He received his bachelor's degree in Business Administration in 1987 from Towson State University.

Career
Shortly after college, Miller began to work as a Deputy Directory for the computer center at the White House Office of Presidential Personnel. In 1990, he became the confidential assistant to Assistant Administrator, Bureau for Legislative Affairs, Agency for International Development. Later, he was appointed as the special assistant to the White House Liaison, Office of Administrator, Agency for International Development, a position he held from 1991-1992. In 1992, he became the White House Liaison for the U.S. Office of Personnel Management. In 1994, he was the Congressional campaign manager for Roscoe Bartlett.

From 1995 until 1996, Miller was a programmer/analyst for Advanced Technology Systems. In 1996, he worked for Booz Allen Hamilton until 2005. Since 2006, Miller has been a business development manager for Human Touch LLC.

Finally, Miller was on the Howard County Republican Central Committee from 1998 - 2003.

As a member of the Maryland House of Delegates, Miller has served on the Economic Matters Committee since 2003, and the Joint Advisory Committee on Legislative Data Systems since 2007.

Miller has worked with fellow Republican Gail Bates to amended the Maryland Constitution to define marriage as the union between a man and a woman.

Legislative notes
 voted against the Clean Indoor Air Act of 2007 (HB359)
 voted against in-state tuition for illegal immigrants in 2007 (HB6)
 voted against the Healthy Air Act in 2006 (SB154)
 voted for slots in 2005 (HB1361)

Election results

2006 Race for Maryland House of Delegates – District 9A
Voters to choose two:
{| class="wikitable"
|-
!Name
!Votes
!Percent
!Outcome
|-
|-
|Gail H. Bates, Rep.
|22,862
|  39.6%
|   Won
|-
|-
|Warren E. Miller, Rep.
|18,533
|  32.1%
|   Won
|-
|-
|David Leonard Osmundson, Dem.
|16,162
|  28.0%
|   Lost
|-
|Other Write-Ins
|     123
|    0.2%
|   Lost
|}

2010 Race for Maryland House of Delegates – District 9A
Voters to choose two:
{| class="wikitable"
|-
!Name
!Votes
!Percent
!Outcome
|-
|-
|Gail H. Bates, Rep.
|21,709
|  30.6%
|   Won
|-
|-
|Warren E. Miller, Rep.
|19,911
|  28.0%
|   Won
|-
|-
|Maryann Maher, Dem.
|15,264
|  21.5%
|   Lost
|-
|Jonathan Weinstein, Dem.
|14,110
|  19.9%
|   Lost
|-
|Other Write-Ins
|      40
|    0.1%
|   Lost
|}

2014 Race for Maryland House of Delegates – District 9A
Voters to choose two:
{| class="wikitable"
|-
!Name
!Votes
!Percent
!Outcome
|-
|-
|Trent Kittleman, Rep.
|24,371
|  37.5%
|   Won
|-
|-
|Warren E. Miller, Rep.
|21,553
|  33.1%
|   Won
|-
|-
|Walter E. Carson, Dem.
|10,144
|  15.6%
|   Lost
|-
|James Ward Morrow, Dem.
|  8,906
|  13.7%
|   Lost
|-
|Other Write-Ins
|      99
|    0.2%
|   Lost
|}

2018 Race for Maryland House of Delegates – District 9A
Voters to choose two:
{| class="wikitable"
|-
!Name
!Votes
!Percent
!Outcome
|-
|-
|Trent Kittleman, Rep.
|24,531
|  30.6%
|   Won
|-
|-
|Warren E. Miller, Rep.
|19,563
|  24.4%
|   Won
|-
|-
|Natalie Ziegler, Dem.
|18,891
|  23.6%
|   Lost
|-
|Steven M. Bolen, Dem.
|17,019
|  21.3%
|   Lost
|-
|Other Write-Ins
|      56
|    0.1%
|   Lost
|}

References and notes

External links
 

Republican Party members of the Maryland House of Delegates
1964 births
Living people
People from Anne Arundel County, Maryland
People from Woodbine, Maryland
Towson University alumni
21st-century American politicians
George H. W. Bush administration personnel